Extraction ratio is a measure in renal physiology, primarily used to calculate renal plasma flow in order to evaluate renal function. It measures the percentage of the compound entering the kidney that was excreted into the final urine.

Measured in concentration in blood plasma, it may thus be expressed as:

, where Pa is the concentration in renal artery, and Pv is the concentration in the renal vein.

For instance, para aminohippuric acid (PAH) is almost completely excreted in the final urine, and thus almost none is found in the venous return (Pv ~0). Therefore, the extraction ratio of PAH ~1. This is why PAH is used in PAH clearance to estimate renal plasma flow.

Hepatic extraction ratio 

The "Hepatic Extraction Ratio" is a similar measurement for clearance of a substance (usually a pharmacological drug) by the liver. It is defined as the fraction of drug removed from blood by the liver, and depends on 3 factors— the hepatic blood flow, the uptake into the hepatocytes, and the enzyme metabolic capacity. Examples of drugs with a high hepatic extraction ratio include propranolol, opiates, and lignocaine.

References

Renal physiology